DWKD (98.5 FM), broadcasting as 98.5 iFM, is a radio station owned and operated by the Radio Mindanao Network. The station's studio and transmitter are located at the 3rd Floor, OMA Bldg. Rizal Ave., Cauayan, Isabela.

References

External links
iFM Cauayan FB Page
iFM Cauayan Website

Radio stations in Isabela (province)
Radio stations established in 2017
IFM stations